is a Japanese comedy romance shōjo manga series written and illustrated by Kiyoko Arai and serialized by Shogakukan on Ciao magazine. It has nine volumes, the first published on 10 September 1996 and the last on 10 October 1999.

Characters
 Mikina

Reception
It won the 44th Shogakukan Manga Award for shōjo manga.

References

Romantic comedy anime and manga
Shogakukan manga
Winners of the Shogakukan Manga Award for shōjo manga